Ralf Berckhan (born 2 October 1931) is a German sprint canoer who competed in the early 1950s and modern pentathlete who competed in the early 1960s. At the 1952 Summer Olympics in Helsinki, he finished sixth in the C-1 1000 m. Eight years later in Rome, Berckhan finished 55th in the individual event and 16th in the team event for the United Team of Germany.

References

1931 births
Living people
Sportspeople from Hamburg
Canoeists at the 1952 Summer Olympics
German male canoeists
German male modern pentathletes
Modern pentathletes at the 1960 Summer Olympics
Olympic canoeists of Germany
Olympic modern pentathletes of the United Team of Germany